Deanna Frazier is an American politician and audiologist serving as a member of the Kentucky House of Representatives from the 81st district.

Early life and education 
Frazier was born and raised in Richmond, Kentucky. She earned a Bachelor of Science degree in communication disorders from Eastern Kentucky University, Master of Arts in communication disorders from the University of Cincinnati, and Doctor of Audiology from the A.T. Still University School of Health Sciences in Arizona.

Career 
Prior to entering politics, Frazier worked as an audiology for the American Academy of Audiology and the Academy of Doctors of Audiology. Frazier is also the founder of Bluegrass Hearing Clinic., LLC in Manchester, Kentucky. Frazier assumed office in 2019, succeeding Wesley Morgan.

References 

Republican Party members of the Kentucky House of Representatives
Women state legislators in Kentucky
Eastern Kentucky University alumni
University of Cincinnati alumni
Audiologists
A. T. Still University alumni
People from Manchester, Kentucky
People from Richmond, Kentucky
Businesspeople from Kentucky
Living people
Year of birth missing (living people)
21st-century American politicians
21st-century American women politicians